Will Osborne (November 25, 1905 – October 22, 1981) was a Canadian-born American bandleader, trombonist, and crooner.

Biography
Osborne started out playing the drums. He began his bandleading career in 1924. He began recording in 1929 with a light, crooning vocal style similar to Rudy Vallée's on Columbia Records. While Vallée was in Hollywood for the filming of The Vagabond Lover, Osborne took over for him at his Heigh-Ho Club. Soon after, both him and Will entered into a fierce rivalry with each other lasting multiple years.

In his book, The Big Bands, George T. Simon noted that the tenor of the times contributed to Osborne's early success: "Then in 1929 came the stock-market crash and the Depression. The high living and the tempos slowed down. The mood and the music of the country changed. The search for security, for sweetness and light, was reflected in the country's musical tastes — in its acceptance of crooners like Rudy Vallee and Will Osborne, and then Bing Crosby and Russ Columbo, in its preference for dance music that encouraged romance and sentiment and escape."

Simon described the band that Osborne formed in 1935 as "a stylized outfit that featured rich, deep-toned brass, emphasizing, of all things, slide trumpets plus glissing trombones blown through megaphones. This he would dub as "Slide Music"

He and his orchestra appeared in the 1946 Monogram musical comedy film Swing Parade of 1946.

A 1948 newspaper article reported that, at that time, "The band holds the all-time attendance record at Palomar Ballroom in Los Angeles."

The Band's theme song was The Gentleman Awaits.

Osborne later became one of the leaders of the orchestra for The Abbott and Costello Show.

Osborne retired from bandleading in 1957. He then became entertainment director for Harvey's Casino in Lake Tahoe, Nevada.

References

External links

WILL OSBORNE ORCHESTRA (as a leader):

 Will Osborne Orchestra 1936 - RESTORED in STEREO "It's De-Lovely" with Dick and Dorothy Rogers
 Will Osborne Orchestra 1945 with Connie Haines "I'm Beginning To See The Light" from The Abbott and Costello radio show

1905 births
1981 deaths
20th-century Canadian male singers
Canadian people of Scottish descent
Canadian emigrants to the United States
Crooners
American radio bandleaders
20th-century American singers